The Berent district was a Prussian district that existed from 1818 to 1920. It was in the part of West Prussia that fell to Poland after World War I in 1920. Its capital was Berent. From 1939 to 1945, the district was re-established in German-occupied Poland as part of the newly established Reichsgau Danzig-West Prussia. Today the territory of the district is located in the Polish Pomeranian Voivodeship.

History 
With the First Partition of Poland in 1772, the area of the future Berent district was annexed by the Kingdom of Prussia and initially belonged to the Stargard district in the province of West Prussia. On April 30, 1815, the Stargard district became part of Regierungsbezirk Danzig. As part of a comprehensive district reform, the new Berent district was formed on April 1, 1818, from parts of the old Stargard district. It included the towns of Berent and Schöneck. The district office was in Berent. The district bordered in the west on the Pomeranian district of Bütow, in the north on the district of Karthaus and the district of Danzig, in the east on the district of Preußisch Stargard and in the south on the district of Konitz.

From December 3, 1829, to April 1, 1878, West Prussia and East Prussia were united to form the Province of Prussia, which had belonged to the German Reich since January 1871. Due to the provisions of the Treaty of Versailles, the Berent district had to be ceded by the German Reich on January 10, 1920. Most of the district fell to Poland. Several communities in the northeastern part of the district were ceded to the Free City of Danzig and were assigned to the Danziger Höhe district.

Demographics 
The district had a mixed population of Germans, Kashubians and Poles.

Politics

District administrators 

 1818–1825:  Johann Carl von Schulz
 1825–1853:  Ludwig Blindow
 1853–1896:  Hermann Engler
 1896–1920:  Friedrich Trüstedt

Elections 
In the German Empire, the districts of Berent and Preußisch Stargard formed the Reichstag constituency of Danzig 5. This constituency was won by candidates from the Polish Party in all elections to the Reichstag between 1871 and 1912.

Municipalities 
In 1910, the Berent district contained the following municipalities: 

The municipalities marked DZ became part of the Danziger Höhe district in the Free City of Danzig. All other municipalities fell to Poland in 1920.

Landkreis Berent in occupied Poland (1939-1945)

History 
After the German invasion of Poland, on 26 November 1939, the Berent district became part of the administrative region of Danzig in the newly formed Reichsgau Danzig-West Prussia. The towns of Berent and Schöneck were subject to the German municipal code of January 30, 1935, which was valid in the Altreich and provided for the enforcement of the Führerprinzip at the municipal level. On December 1, 1939, 11 communities from the northern part of the Berent district were transferred to the new Danzig district. Towards the end of World War II, the district was occupied by the Red Army in the spring of 1945 and was restored to Poland. The remaining German population was expelled.

District administrators 

 1939–1940: Günter Modrow
 1940–1941: Kurt Witte
 1941–1944: Heinz Hesemann

Place names 

On June 25, 1942, all place names were Germanized with the consent of the Reich Minister of the Interior. Either the name from 1918 was retained or - if "not German" enough - acoustically adjusted or translated, for example:
 Gostomken: Fichtenau
 Groß Pallubin: Großpahlen
 Konarschin: Kunertsfeld
 Neupodleß: Neupoldersee
 Olpuch: Klettenhagen
 Stawisken: Teichdorf
 Trzebuhn: Tremborn
 Wigonin: Angersdorf

References 

Kościerzyna County
Berent
Berent
Berent
Berent